Dubai Towers may refer to:

Dubai Towers Doha, a skyscraper under construction in Doha, Qatar
Dubai Towers Dubai, a proposed four skyscraper complex in Dubai, United Arab Emirates
Dubai Towers Istanbul, a proposed twin towers complex in Istanbul, Turkey

See also
Dubai Mixed-Use Towers, a hotel tower and a residential tower in Dubai, United Arab Emirates